Melaleuca filifolia, commonly called wiry honey-myrtle, is a plant in the myrtle family Myrtaceae, and is endemic to the south-west of  Western Australia. It is a woody, twiggy shrub with needle-shaped leaves, greenish flower buds, pink "pom-pom" flower heads and spherical clusters of fruits.

Description

The heads are on the ends of branches which continue to grow after flowering, and often also in upper leaf axils. Each head contains 6 to 13 groups of flowers in threes. The stamens are purple, pink or mauve with golden tips and are arranged in five bundles around the flower, each bundle containing 7 to 11 stamens.

Taxonomy and naming
Melaleuca filifolia was first formally described in 1862 by Ferdinand von Mueller in Fragmenta Phytographiae Australiae from a specimen found in the dry bed of the Murchison River by Augustus Oldfield. The specific epithet (filifolia) is derived from the Latin words filum meaning "filament" and folium meaning "leaf", referring to the narrow leaves.

Distribution and habitat
This melaleuca occurs between the Kalbarri and Mullewa districts near Geraldton in the Avon Wheatbelt, Geraldton Sandplains and Yalgoo biogeographic regions. It grows in a range of soils and situations including sandy, gravelly and loamy soil over sandstone in Kwongan or tall scrub.

Conservation status
Melaleuca filifolia is listed as "not threatened" by the Government of Western Australia Department of Parks and Wildlife.

Use in horticulture
Some forms of this species are grown in gardens.

References

filifolia
Myrtales of Australia
Plants described in 1862
Endemic flora of Western Australia
Taxa named by Ferdinand von Mueller